Anoplotherium is an extinct genus of herbivorous artiodactyl mammal, possibly belonging to or a close relative of the suborder Tylopoda, which lived in Europe from the Late Eocene to the earliest Oligocene. Fossils of Anoplotherium were first discovered in the gypsum quarries of Paris in 1804 and were subsequently described by French naturalist Georges Cuvier. One of the first Paleogene mammals to be described, 19th Century reconstructions of Anoplotherium can be seen at Crystal Palace Park.

Etymology 
The genus name Anoplotherium is a compound of the Greek prefixes αν ('an') meaning 'not', ὅπλον ('hóplon') meaning 'armor, large shield' and the suffix θήρ ('thēr') meaning beast or wild animal. Therefore, the genus name has a full meaning of 'Unarmed Beast', a reference to the lack of tusks or horns.

Palaeontology 
Fossils attributed to the genus Anoplotherium have been found in Late Eocene to earliest Oligocene strata in the United Kingdom, France, Spain, Switzerland, Germany and Portugal between 37 million and 33 million years ago. Its occurrence in the European fossil record spans European Mammal Paleogene Zones MP17-MP20, and the Headonian European Land Mammal Mega Zone (ELMMZ).

In the United Kingdom isolated teeth, bones and a partial skeleton of Anoplotherium have been found in the Priabonian to Rupelian aged Solent Group strata of the Hampshire Basin, a series of freshwater/brackish coastal plain deposits now exposed on the northern coastline of the Isle of Wight. Within the Solent Group fossils have been found in the upper members of the Headon Hill Formation, the Bembridge Limestone Formation and the Bouldnor Formation.

First discovered in France, Anoplotherium material has been collected from the famous Late Eocene Gypsum of Montmarte in the Paris Basin and several sites in the Aquitanian Basin, including the karstic deposits of the Phosphorites des Quercy, Eymet in the Dordogne and Apt in Provence.

Anoplotherium became extinct during the Grande Coupure, a major faunal turnover event in early Oligocene Europe that saw the extinction of many of the endemic mammal groups typical of Eocene Europe. These groups including the Anoplotheriidae were subsequently replaced by new taxa from Asia such as anthracotheres, entelodonts and rhinocerotids

Paleobiology 
Anoplotherium was a relatively large herbivore for Late Eocene Europe, living in typical Headonian faunas alongside groups such as palaeotheres, pachynolophids, creodonts, choeropotamids, xiphonodontids, adapid and omomyid primates, and bear-dogs amongst many others. Anoplotherium may have preferred wooded habitats, with sub-tropical woodland common across much of the genus' range. The dentition of Anoplotherium is selenodont.

A 2006 anatomical study by Hooker on specimens from Montmartre, and a near intact skeleton of an immature individual from the Bouldnor Formation of the Isle of Wight, UK, found the skeletal morphology and functionality of Anoplotherium to indicate it was likely capable of bipedal browsing, using its muscular tail for support. Anoplotherium would have been able to browse 2-3m off the ground, greatly reducing interspecific competition with other contemporaneous mammalian herbivores.

The study also suggests that two of the originally recognised species of Anoplotherium, A.latipes and A.commune, distinguished on the basis of toe numbers, may instead represent sexual dimorphs of the same species A.latipes. Hiard et al. 2014 suggested that if A.latipes and A.commune are sexual dimorphs as suggested by Hooker (with A.latipes representing the male and A.commune representing the female) then the well developed second digit of Anoplotherium latipes may have been an adaption to intraspecific combat between males.

The partial skeleton of the immature individual from the Isle of Wight described in Hooker, 2006 was discovered in a fluvial channel horizon containing large coniferous logs. The bones showed signs of post-mortem scavenging by crocodilians, most likely the European alligatoroid Diplocynodon.

References

External links

Fossil taxa described in 1804
Tylopoda
Paleogene mammals of Europe
Eocene even-toed ungulates
Fossils of France
Taxa named by Georges Cuvier
Prehistoric even-toed ungulate genera